William L. Sauder, OC, OBC (May 27, 1926 – December 19, 2007) was formerly the chairman of Sauder Industries Ltd. and International Forest Products Limited

Sauder graduated from the University of British Columbia in 1948, where he was a member of the Phi Delta Theta fraternity, with a Bachelor of Commerce degree, and later returned to the University of British Columbia as a member of the Board of Governors. He was ultimately appointed chair of the board, and later elected Chancellor, a position he held from 1996 to 2002. He was awarded an honorary Doctor of Laws degree by UBC in 1990.

On June 5, 2003, Sauder donated a $20 million endowment and the University of British Columbia's Faculty of Commerce and Business Administration which was subsequently renamed the Sauder School of Business. His gift of $20 million was the largest single private donation ever made to a Canadian business school at the time.

In 2004, he was awarded the Order of British Columbia.
William Sauder died after a brief illness on December 19, 2007.

References

External links

UBC Sauder School of Business
 
 
 

1926 births
2007 deaths
Businesspeople in timber
Canadian chief executives
Canadian philanthropists
Chancellors of the University of British Columbia
Members of the Order of British Columbia
UBC Sauder School of Business alumni
20th-century philanthropists
Officers of the Order of Canada